The 1969 Volunteer 500 was a NASCAR Grand National Series event that was held on July 20, 1969, at Bristol International Speedway in Bristol, Tennessee; which was rebuilt with more banking for this race.

The transition to purpose-built racecars began in the early 1960s and occurred gradually over that decade.  Changes made to the sport by the late 1960s brought an end to the "strictly stock" vehicles of the 1950s.

Race report
It took three hours, eight minutes, and seven seconds for the event to reach its conclusion. David Pearson defeated Bobby Isaac by more than three laps in front of an audience of thirty-two thousand people. Roy Tyner finished 97 laps down and still recorded his only top-10 finish of the season; making this event one of attrition. After this race, Pearson took second on the all-time wins list, where he still sits today some 95 wins behind Petty.

Pearson drove his Ford Torino Talladega to one of his eleven victories of the 1969 NASCAR Cup Series season. This race would bring Cecil Gordon's first finish in the top five. Even during the late-1960s, starting way back in 24th place and taking fifth at the checkered flag was really considered to be a long distance between the two positions.

Total winnings for this race were $27,685 ($ when adjusted for inflation).

This race's importance in the history book would be that the famous Apollo 11 moon landing would take place on the same day, with Neil Armstrong making his famous walk on the Moon. Henley Gray deliberately quit the race to get home in time to watch the moon landing on television; according to urban legend. As a result, he won $550 ($ when adjusted for inflation) in prize money and finished only 206 out of the 500 laps of the race.

Notable crew chiefs for this race were Herb Nab, Harry Hyde, Dale Inman, Banjo Matthews, Glen Wood, Dick Hutcherson, and Cotton Owens.

Qualifying

Finishing order
Section reference:

 David Pearson† (No. 17)
 Bobby Isaac† (No. 71)
 Donnie Allison (No. 27)
 James Hylton (No. 48)
 Cecil Gordon (No. 47)
 Ben Arnold (No. 76)
 Bill Seifert (No. 45)
 Bill Champion† (No. 10)
 J.D. McDuffie† (No. 70)
 Roy Tyner† (No. 9)
 LeeRoy Yarbrough*† (No. 98)
 Walson Gardener* (No. 63)
 Ed Hessert* (No. 15)
 Elmo Langley*† (No. 64)
 Henley Gray* (No. 19)
 John Sears*† (No. 4)
 Neil Castles* (No. 06)
 G.C. Spencer*† (No. 49)
 Wendell Scott*† (No. 34)
 Dave Marcis* (No. 30)
 E.J. Trivette* (No. 08)
 Buddy Young* (No. 31)
 Richard Petty* (No. 43)
 Cale Yarborough* (No. 21)
 Dick Brooks*† (No. 32)
 Bobby Allison* (No. 22)
 Buddy Baker*† (No. 6)
 Jabe Thomas* (No. 25)
 Wayne Gillette* (No. 09)
 Coo Coo Marlin*† (No. 07)
 Earl Brooks*† (No. 26)
 Bobby Mausgrover* (No. 57)

† signifies that the driver is known to be deceased 
* Driver failed to finish race

Timeline
Section reference:
 Start: Cale Yarborough was leading the other drivers as the green flag was waved in the air.
 Lap 32: Bobby Allison took over the lead from Cale Yarborough.
 Lap 33: James Hylton took over the lead from Bobby Allison.
 Lap 82: David Pearson took over the lead from James Hylton.
 Lap 94: Bobby Isaac took over the lead from David Pearson.
 Lap 97: Donnie Allison took over the lead from Bobby Isaac.
 Lap 183: David Pearson took over the lead from Donnie Allison.
 Lap 345: Bobby Isaac took over the lead from David Pearson.
 Lap 358: LeeRoy Yarbrough took over the lead from Bobby Isaac.
 Lap 359: David Pearson took over the lead from LeeRoy Yarbrough.
 Finish: David Pearson was officially declared the winner of the event.

References

Volunteer 500
Volunteer 500
NASCAR races at Bristol Motor Speedway